Blore Heath was a rural district in Staffordshire, England from 1894 to 1932.

It was created under the Local Government Act 1894 from that part of the Market Drayton rural sanitary district which was in Staffordshire (the Shropshire part becoming Drayton Rural District).  It covered the parishes of Ashley, Mucklestone and Tyrley.

It was abolished by a County Review Order in 1932, and was added to the Newcastle-under-Lyme Rural District.

References
https://web.archive.org/web/20071001002624/http://www.visionofbritain.org.uk/relationships.jsp?u_id=10042677&c_id=10001043

History of Staffordshire
Districts of England created by the Local Government Act 1894
Borough of Newcastle-under-Lyme
Rural districts of England